Chafik Bouaoud (born 12 February 1999) is an Algerian sports shooter. He competed in the men's 10 metre air rifle event at the 2016 Summer Olympics.

References

External links
 

1999 births
Living people
Algerian male sport shooters
Olympic shooters of Algeria
Shooters at the 2016 Summer Olympics
Place of birth missing (living people)
21st-century Algerian people